Trichogypsiidae is a family of sponges in the class Calcarea.

Genera
Kuarrhaphis Dendy & Row, 1913
Leucyssa Haeckel, 1872
Trichogypsia Carter, 1871

References

Calcaronea
Sponge families
Taxa named by Nicole Boury-Esnault
Taxa named by Jean Vacelet